Edward Francis Wilson (September 7, 1909 – April 11, 1979) was a professional baseball player. He played parts of two seasons in Major League Baseball for the Brooklyn Dodgers in 1936 and 1937, primarily as a right fielder.

Playing career

Amateur career 
Wilson was a triple threat athlete at Hillhouse High School in New Haven, Connecticut starring in football, basketball and baseball, captaining both football and baseball teams in his senior year. Emmons Chick Bowens, renowned football, basketball and baseball coach at Hillhouse High, considered  Eddie to be one of the most accomplished all-around athletes to come out of Connecticut. He went on to play college ball at College of the Holy Cross.

Minor leagues 
Wilson broke into professional baseball at 19 in the Eastern League with the New Haven Profs. He also appeared in the International League for Baltimore in 8 games that season, batting .290. The next season, he batted .313 for the Henderson Gamecocks of the Piedmont League where he was an All-Star.

Wilson played for Springfield in 1933 in the Mid-Atlantic League, where he hit .337 and had 25 stolen bases in 30 attempts. Overall, he had 66 home runs and 620 RBI during his minor league career, which lasted from 1929-41.

Major leagues 
In his major league career, Wilson had 72 hits, 39 runs, 12 doubles, 2 triples, 4 home runs, 33 RBI and 4 stolen bases.

Personal life 
Wilson volunteered for service in the Merchant Marines during World War II and was a school teacher.

Wilson died in 1979 at age 69, and is buried at St. Lawrence Cemetery in West Haven, Connecticut.

References

External links

Major League Baseball outfielders
Brooklyn Dodgers players
New Haven Profs players
Baltimore Orioles (IL) players
Henderson Gamecocks players
York White Roses players
Charlotte Hornets (baseball) players
Springfield Chicks players
Hazleton Mountaineers players
Allentown Brooks players
Jersey City Giants players
Portland Beavers players
Chattanooga Lookouts players
Salem Senators players
Wenatchee Chiefs players
Baseball players from Connecticut
People from Hamden, Connecticut
1909 births
1979 deaths
United States Merchant Mariners of World War II